Josh Bornstein is an Australian lawyer specialising in employment and labour relations law who has acted in several high profile legal matters. He is a member of the Board of economic think tank, Per Capita and the Advisory Board of the Centre for Employment and Labour Relations Law at the University of Melbourne. He is also head of Industrial Relations at Maurice Blackburn Lawyers, is deputy Chair of the Racing Appeals and Disciplinary Board. He is President of Tzedek.org, an advocacy organisation for victims of child sexual abuse within the Jewish community in Australia. Bornstein regularly represents women who have been subject to bullying or sexual harassment in the workplace. In 2021, Bornstein ran for preselection to represent the Australian Labor Party, following the retirement of Senator Kim Carr. Bornstein withdrew from the nomination following an article by The Australian, after it was revealed he had referred to Chris Bowen as a "muppet". Bornstein is said to be considering a second attempt at running for the senate.

He is ranked as Victoria's top employment lawyer by Doyle's Guide to the Australian Legal Profession, 2013 edition.

Cases in which Bornstein has been involved include
 Representing Two women sexually harassed by Peter Vickery
 Representing the Australian Workers' Union and Larry Knight's family over the Beaconsfield mine collapse 
 Representing Australian Council of Trade Unions and Ansett Australia employees over the insolvency of the Ansett group of companies
 Assisting the Maritime Union of Australia defeat Patrick Stevedores in the High Court (see also 1998 Australian waterfront dispute)
 Representing the Wilderness Society who were sued by Gunns Limited
 Representing the Speaker of the House of Representatives, Peter Slipper, in pursuing an abuse of process case against James Ashby.
 Representing Essendon Football Club in its challenge to the legality of the ASADA investigation.

He has publicly campaigned for the introduction of a national workplace bullying law and for a Royal Commission to be established into institutional child sexual abuse.

References

21st-century Australian lawyers
Living people
Australian Jews
Year of birth missing (living people)